Luis Carlos Abregu (born 15 December 1982) is an Argentine former professional boxer who competed from 2005 to 2016.

Professional career
Abregu made his professional debut on 4 March 2005, defeating fellow Argentine Alberto Evaristo Torres via third-round technical knockout. Abregu built up a record of 19-0, all fought in his native Argentina, before fighting overseas for the first time as he travelled to the United States to beat Christian Solano.

His first loss came at the hands of Timothy Bradley. Bradley, who moved up from light welterweight, won the match on a unanimous decision on July 17, 2010 at the Agua Caliente Casino in Rancho Mirage, California.

Professional boxing record

References

External links

Argentine male boxers
Living people
1982 births
People from Chicligasta Department
Welterweight boxers